In enzymology, a 4-hydroxybutyrate dehydrogenase is an enzyme that catalyzes the chemical reaction

4-hydroxybutanoate + NAD+  succinate semialdehyde + NADH + H+

The two substrates of this enzyme are therefore 4-hydroxybutanoic acid, and NAD+, whereas its 3 products are succinate semialdehyde, NADH, and H+.

This enzyme belongs to the family of oxidoreductases, specifically those acting on the CH-OH group of donor with NAD+ or NADP+ as acceptor. The systematic name of this enzyme class is 4-hydroxybutanoate:NAD+ oxidoreductase. This enzyme is also called gamma-hydroxybutyrate dehydrogenase. This enzyme participates in butanoate metabolism and the degradation of the neurotransmitter 4-hydroxybutanoic acid.

References

EC 1.1.1
NADH-dependent enzymes
Enzymes of unknown structure